Pop Life is the third studio album released by French DJ David Guetta. It was released in 2007 and produced with Joachim Garraud. Longtime collaborator Chris Willis is the main vocalist; guest vocals are provided by JD Davis, Tara McDonald, Cozi Costi, Juliet Richardson and Thailand. The album has sold 530,000 copies worldwide and 18,000 copies in the United States.

The first single to be released from Pop Life was "Love Is Gone", which became a top 10 hit on the UK Singles Chart, peaking at number 9. The remix by Fred Rister (Frédéric Riesterer) and Joachim Garraud received plays in dance clubs across the world. The second single was "Baby When the Light", which featured vocals by Cozi and addition production by Steve Angello. Subsequent singles include "Delirious", featuring Tara McDonald on vocals, "Tomorrow Can Wait" and "Everytime We Touch".

Track listing

Chart performance

Weekly charts

Year-end charts

Certifications and sales

References

2007 albums
David Guetta albums
Virgin Records albums
Albums produced by David Guetta